"I Do Believe" is a song recorded by the American country supergroup The Highwaymen for their 1995 album The Road Goes on Forever. It was written by Waylon Jennings and produced by Don Was, with Jennings providing lead vocals on the track.

Background and composition

The song has highly pandeistic-sounding overtones, as it derides conventional religious belief in Heaven and Hell while affirming a religious belief under which one ought to "live life to the fullest." In his autobiography, Jennings related of I Do Believe that, "when I finished the song, and before the Highwaymen recorded it, I showed it to Will"—that being 'bootleg preacher' Will D. Campbell—who simply responded, 'That'll preach.'"

Release
The song was originally released on The Highwaymen album The Road Goes on Forever (1995), and was later included as the last song on Jennings' Nashville Rebel box set. It also appeared on the Red Hot and Country video.
It was covered by Bonnie Bramlett on her 2008 album, Beautiful.

Reception
The song wasn't a commercial hit, however, it is considered one of Jennings' finest compositions. Musicologist Colin Larkin, in his Encyclopedia of Popular Music, described the song as "thought-provoking" and wrote with respect to Jennings that the song "showed him at his best, questioning religious beliefs."

Personnel
The Highwaymen
Johnny Cash
Waylon Jennings – lead vocals
Kris Kristofferson
Willie Nelson

Technical personnel
Don Was – production

References

1995 songs
Songs written by Waylon Jennings
Song recordings produced by Don Was
The Highwaymen (country supergroup) songs